Virgil C. Dechant  (September 24, 1930 – February 15, 2020) was the twelfth Supreme Knight of the Knights of Columbus, a position he held from January 21, 1977, to September 30, 2000.

Biography 
Dechant was born September 24, 1930, in Antonino, Ellis County, Kansas, and lived in Leawood, Kansas. His ancestors were German-Russians from the Mariental region. He and his wife Ann L. Dechant had four children and 12 grandchildren. 

Prior to joining the Knights of Columbus in 1967 in the role of Supreme Secretary, Dechant worked as a farmer and a farm equipment salesperson. He also owned a car dealership.

Dechant served as the vice president of the Vatican Bank, a Gentleman of His Holiness, and a Councillor on the State Council for Vatican City. 

He had the honor of escorting President George W. Bush to the funeral of Pope John Paul II.

Dechant stepped down as Supreme Knight of the Knights of Columbus on September 30, 2000, at the age of seventy after serving the longest term ever by a Supreme Knight. He was succeeded by Carl A. Anderson.

Dechant died on February 15, 2020, at the age of 89.

Distinctions 
 Knight Grand Cross of the Order of Pope Pius IX
 Knight Grand Cross of the Order of St. Gregory the Great
 Knight of Magistral Grace of the Sovereign Military Order of Malta
 Knight of the Equestrian Order of the Holy Sepulchre of Jerusalem
 Cross of Merit with Gold Star of the Equestrian Order of the Holy Sepulchre of Jerusalem
 National Right to Life award along with Senator Jesse Helms (1998)
 Gaudium and Spes Medal of the Knights of Columbus

References 

1930 births
2020 deaths
People from Ellis County, Kansas
People from Kansas City, Kansas
American bankers
Roman Catholic activists
Papal chamberlains
Knights Grand Cross of the Order of Pope Pius IX
Knights Grand Cross of the Order of St Gregory the Great
Papal gentlemen
Supreme Knights of the Knights of Columbus
Knights of the Holy Sepulchre
People from Leawood, Kansas
Catholics from Kansas
American people of German-Russian descent